The 63rd Infantry Division "Cirene" was an infantry division of the Royal Italian Army during World War II. The division was formed on 1 October 1937 in Benghazi in Italian Libya and named for the nearby antique city of Cyrene. The division's regimental depots were in mainland Italy in Liguria and shared with the 37th Infantry Division "Modena", with both divisions recruiting their troops from and training them there. The Cirene was classified as an auto-transportable division, meaning it had some motorized transport, but not enough to move the entire division at once. The division was destroyed on 5 January 1941 during the Battle of Bardia.

History

World War I 
The division's lineage begins with the Brigade "Liguria" established in preparation for Italy's entry into World War I in Genova on 1 March 1915. The brigade consisted of the 157th and 158th infantry regiments, which were manned by reservists from Liguria. The brigade fought on the Italian front and for their conduct the brigade's two infantry regiments were awarded Italy's highest military honor, the Gold Medal of Military Valour. After the war the regiments raised during the war were dissolved, with the exception of those, who had been awarded a Gold Medal of Military Valour.

On 6 November 1926 the brigade command and the 158th Infantry Regiment were disbanded, while the 157th Infantry Regiment "Liguria" was transferred to the XVIII Infantry Brigade.

On 1 October 1937 the 63rd Infantry Division "Cirene" was established in Benghazi in Libya with the 225th Infantry Regiment "Arezzo" from the 24th Infantry Division "Gran Sasso". The same month the 157th Infantry Regiment "Liguria" left the 18th Infantry Division "Metauro" and was transferred to Libya to join the Cirene. The same year the 44th Artillery Regiment was revived in Italy and then transferred to Libya to join the division. On 1 March 1938 the 225th Infantry Regiment "Arezzo" was renamed 158th Infantry Regiment "Liguria".

The division's major units were:
 63rd Infantry Division "Cirene", in Benghazi
 157th Infantry Regiment "Liguria", in Benghazi
 158th Infantry Regiment "Liguria", in Marj
 45th Artillery Regiment, in Abyar

In 1939 the division's three regiments were renamed "Cirene".

World War II 

At Italy's entry into World War II on 10 June 1940, the Cirene was at Al Adam (now Tobruk Airport) in the East of Italian Libya. In August 1940 it moved to the Sallum-Bardia area near the border with British Egypt. From 9 September 1940 the Cirene participated in the Italian invasion of Egypt, crossing into Egypt on 13 September and reaching Sidi Barrani on 16 September. Afterwards, the Italian 10th Army formed a defensive line composed of big outposts separated by wide desert areas. At the southern end of the line was the Buqbuq sector, where the Cirene fortified four strong points around a rocky hill near Ābār Abū Safāfī (Bir Sofafi), ‘Alam ar Rābiyah (Alam Rabia), the crossroads at point 236 , the crossroads at Qabr el Mahdi (Qabe Mahdi) and point 226 near Ābār Abū Safāfī (Bir Sofafi). They were separated from the next formation to the north, the Maletti Group by a  gap.

The opening stage of the British offensive Operation Compass is known in Italy as the "Battle of the Marmarica" after the name of the coastal plain where the battle was fought. The British know it as the "Battle of the Camps" after the individual Italian camps set up in a defensive line outside of Sidi Barrani. On 11 December 1940, a patrol from the 7th Support Group entered Rabia to find it empty. The Cirene had withdrawn from there and Ābār Abū Safāfī (Sofafi) overnight. The British 4th Armoured Brigade was ordered to cut them off west of Ābār Abū Safāfī (Sofafi), but arrived too late and the Cirene was able to make its way along the top of the escarpment and link up with Italian forces at Halfaya Pass during the retreat to Sallum.

By 15 December the Italian commander Annibale Bergonzoli at Bardia had approximately 40,000 defenders under his command, but the situation deteriorated rapidly due heavy aerial bombardment and continued Allied ground attacks. The Italian divisions defending the perimeter from Sallum to Bardia included remnants of the Cirene, the 62nd Infantry Division "Marmarica", the 1st CC.NN. Division "23 Marzo", and the 2nd CC.NN. Division "28 Ottobre". At first, the Cirene division guarded the Marsá al Murayghah (Mrega) zone, which was a part of an  perimeter which had a permanent anti-tank ditch, extensive wire fence, and a double row of concrete strong points. But soon British bombardment of the front line has increased to an intolerable level, therefore the bulk of Cirene retreated to Bardia city proper.

On 3 January 1941, the British forces resumed their offensive, starting the Battle of Bardia. As the Allied forces advanced, the Italian units were surrounded, cut off from their supplies and defeated. After some hard fighting, one position after another surrendered. The Australians captured Bardia on 5 January, taking 45,000 prisoners and 462 guns for a loss of 130 dead and 326 wounded of their own. Whenever the Italians choose to fight, the fighting was fierce. An Australian historian later wrote that "in parts their defense was most efficient and often extremely brave". The majority of Italian units have surrendered without fight, their morale sapped by hunger, thirst, lice and dysentery.

Organization 

  63rd Infantry Division "Cirene"
 157th Infantry Regiment "Cirene"
 Command Company
 3x Fusilier battalions
 Support Weapons Company (65/17 infantry support guns)
 Mortar Company (81mm Mod. 35 mortars)
 158th Infantry Regiment "Cirene"
 Command Company
 3x Fusilier battalions
 Support Weapons Company (65/17 infantry support guns)
 Mortar Company (81mm Mod. 35 mortars)
 45th Artillery Regiment "Cirene"
 Command Unit
 I Group (100/17 howitzers)
 II Group (75/27 field guns)
 III Group (75/27 field guns)
 2x Anti-aircraft batteries (20/65 Mod. 35 anti-aircraft guns)
 Ammunition and Supply Unit
 LXIII Tank Battalion "L" (L3/35 tankettes; transferred to the 64th Infantry Division "Catanzaro" on 9 December 1940)
 LXIII Machine Gun Battalion
 LXIII Mixed Engineer Battalion
 63rd Telegraph and Radio Operators Company
 1x Engineer Company
 1x Searchlight Section
 LXIII Replacements Battalion
 63rd Anti-tank Company (47/32 anti-tank guns)
 1x Transport Unit
 27th Medical Section
 2x Field hospitals
 1x Surgical unit
 9th Supply Section
 1x Bakers section
 337th Carabinieri Section
 338th Carabinieri Section
 263rd Field Post Office

Attached to the division:
 63rd Bersaglieri Motorcyclists Company

Military honors 
For its conduct during the Western Desert campaign the President of Italy awarded on 7 December 1951 to the III Battalion of the 157th Infantry Regiment "Cirene" Italy's highest military honor, the Gold Medal of Military Valour.
  III Battalion/ 157th Infantry Regiment "Cirene" on 7 December 1951

Commanding officers 
The division's commanding officers were:
 Generale di Divisione Carlo Spatocco (1 October 1937 - 23 September 1940)
 Generale di Brigata Alessandro De Guidi (24 September 1940 - 5 January 1941)

Notes

References

Bibliography 

 
 
 
 
 
 

Infantry divisions of Italy in World War II
Military units and formations established in 1937
Military units and formations disestablished in 1941